Three Chords and the Truth is the debut studio album by American country music artist Sara Evans. The album's title comes from Harlan Howard, a country music songwriter to whom this quote is widely attributed. It also was an improvized lyric in U2's version of the Bob Dylan song "All Along the Watchtower," released on the Rattle and Hum album. The album was released in July 1997 via RCA Records Nashville and it produced three singles: "True Lies", the title track, and "Shame About That". Even though all three singles charted on the U.S. Billboard Hot Country Songs chart, none of them reached the Top 40, making this Evans' only major label album to not produce any Top 40 hits.

Content
This album consists of mostly traditional country. It was hailed by critics as one of the best albums of the year and made the critics top 10 of the year lists for The Washington Post, Billboard, Dallas Morning News,  and Country Music People. The album itself has brought prestige and was nominated for many awards such as an Academy of Country Music Nomination for "Top New Female Vocalist." The video for the title track directed by Susan Johnson was nominated for "Country Video of the Year" by the 1998 Music Video Production Association and for "Best New Clip" at the 1997 Billboard Music Video Awards. In addition, Evans was named one of Country America's "Ten To Watch In 1998/Top 10 New Stars Of 1998."

Three of the songs on this album are covers: "Imagine That" was originally recorded by Patsy Cline; "I've Got a Tiger by the Tail" by Buck Owens; and "Walk out Backwards" by Bill Anderson.

Critical reception

Giving it 3 out of 5 stars, Daniel Cooper of New Country magazine praised the inclusion of material from Melba Montgomery, Buck Owens, and Bill Anderson, and the "honky tonk kick" of Pete Anderson's production. He thought that the album "references the country past without ever sounding unfriendly to 90's country radio" and that Evans had a "clear and strong" voice, but criticized the "abstraction" of the songs that Evans wrote. James Chrispell of Allmusic rated the album 4 out of 5 stars, saying that "This disc rings out with an air of originality helped along by great tunes and solid backup musicianship."

Track listing

Personnel 
From Three Chords and the Truth liner notes.

 Sara Evans – lead vocals, backing vocals
 Skip Edwards – keyboards, acoustic piano, organ, accordion
 Kevin Dukes – acoustic guitar
 Dean Parks – acoustic guitar
 Pete Anderson – electric lead guitars, bajo sexto, handclaps
 Doug Pettibone – electric rhythm guitars
 Bucky Baxter – dobro, mandolin, pedal steel guitar
 Tom Brumley – pedal steel guitar, lap steel guitar
 Scott Joss – fiddle, mandolin
 Taras Prodaniuk – bass
 Jim Christie – drums
 Jimmy Bond – string arrangements 
 Murray Adler – conductor
 Beth Anderson – backing vocals
 Tommy Funderburk – backing vocals
 Jim Lauderdale – backing vocals
 Joy Lynn White – backing vocals

Production 
 Pete Anderson – producer, arrangements 
 Michael Dumas – recording
 Dusty Wakeman – recording
 Judy Clapp – mixing
 Elijah Bradford – additional engineer
 Carlos Castro – additional engineer 
 Connie Hill – additional engineer
 James Mcilvery – additional engineer
 Stephen Marcussen – mastering at Precision Mastering (Hollywood, California)
 Barbara Hein – production coordinator 
 Buddy Jackson – art direction
 Mary Hamilton – art direction
 Karrine Caulkins – design 
 Vern Evans – photography 
 Eric Bradley – lyric typist 
 Steve Moore – guitar technician 
 Gary White – guitar technician 
 John Garfield – drum tuning

Chart performance

Album

Singles

References

1997 debut albums
Sara Evans albums
RCA Records albums
Albums produced by Pete Anderson